H1 histone family, member 0 is a member of the histone family of nuclear proteins which are a component of chromatin.  In humans, this protein is encoded by the H1F0 gene.

References